James Kevin Hevey (30 April 1923 – 16 October 2021) was an Australian rules footballer who played with Hawthorn in the Victorian Football League (VFL).

Family
The son of Augustine Lawrence Michael Hevey (1884-1970), and Margaret Jean Hevey (1885-1984), née Sinclair, James Kevin Hevey was born at Malvern, Victoria on 5 April 1923.

He married Joyce Isabelle Reid (1928-2011) in 1950.

Football

Hawthorn (VFL)
Recruited from the Tooronga Football Club in 1941, he began his career at Hawthorn playing in the Second XVIII.

He returned to Hawthorn after his military service.

Camberwell (VFA)
In 1949, along with his Hawthorn team-mate Bob Milgate, Hevey transferred to Camberwell in the VFA.

Military service
Hevey served as a member of the 24th Battalion (Australia) in World War II.

Death
Hevey died at Montrose, Victoria on 16 October 2021, at the age of 98. At the time of his death, Hevey was noted as being the oldest former Hawthorn player.

Notes

References
 
 Haby, Peter (2013), "Old Hawthorn families visit Museum", hawthornfc.com.au, 1 May 2013.
 Haby, Peter (2021), "The Club loses its Oldest Hawk", hawthornfc.com.au, 22 October 2021.
 
 World War Two Nominal Roll: Private James Kevin Hevey (VX143539), Department of Veterans' Affairs.
 B883, VX143539: World War Two Service Record: Private James Kevin Hevey (VX143539), National Archives of Australia.

External links 
 
 
 Kevin Hevey, at The VFA Project.

1923 births
2021 deaths
Australian rules footballers from Melbourne
Camberwell Football Club players
Hawthorn Football Club players
People from Malvern, Victoria
Australian Army personnel of World War II
Military personnel from Melbourne